The Taukkyan War Cemetery is a cemetery for Allied soldiers from the British Commonwealth who died in battle in Burma during the Second World War. It is maintained by the Commonwealth War Graves Commission.

The cemetery contains the graves of 6,374 soldiers who died in the Second World War, the graves of 52 soldiers who died in Burma during the First World War, and memorial pillars (The Rangoon Memorial) with the names of over 27,000 Commonwealth soldiers who died in Burma during the Second World War in the Burma Campaign but who have no known grave. There are 867 graves that contain the remains of unidentified soldiers.
It is one of the most visited and high rated war sites of all Asia.

History
The cemetery was opened in 1951 and the remains of Commonwealth soldiers who died in Meiktila, Akyab (Sittwe), Mandalay, and Sahmaw were transferred here and the graves are grouped together by these battles. A large number of the 27,000 names of Commonwealth soldiers are of the Indian Army and African soldiers who fought and died in Burma. Of the total, 1,819 graves are Indian soldiers.

Notable graves
Seven holders of the Victoria Cross (VC) are interred at this site and the names of several (including five Indian VC holders) are inscribed on the Rangoon Memorial. The interred soldiers are:
 Michael Allmand (1923–1944), for action in Burma on 23 June 1944
 Frank Gerald Blaker (1920–1944), for action in Burma on 9 July 1944
 George Albert Cairns (1913–1944), for action in Burma on 13 March 1944
 Charles Ferguson Hoey (1914–1944), for action in Burma on 16 February 1944
 George Arthur Knowland (1922–1945), for action in Burma on 31 January 1945
 Claud Raymond (1923–1945), for action in Burma on 21 March 1945
 William Basil Weston (1924–1945), for action in Burma on 3 March 1945

Other notable people buried there include: 
South African first-class cricketer Leigh Alexander (1898–1943)
British flying ace Bryan Draper
Welsh poet Alun Lewis
Englishman Tom Mitford, the only brother of the famous Mitford sisters.

Also inscribed, in English, Hindi, Urdu, Gurmukhi, and Burmese,  on the Rangoon Memorial are the words they died for all free men. The Taukkyan Cremation Memorial, also at the site, commemorates more than 1000 soldiers who were cremated according to their faith.

See also
 Thanbyuzayat War Cemetery
 Burma Campaign
 Fourteenth Army (XIV Army)
 Chindits

References

External links

 

Yangon
Military history of Myanmar
Cemeteries in Myanmar
Commonwealth War Graves Commission cemeteries in Myanmar
World War II sites in Burma
1951 establishments in Burma